Donnalyn Bartolome(born July 9, 1994) is a Filipino internet personality, vlogger, singer, songwriter and rapper

Discography

Albums 
2014: Kakaibabe
2015: Happy Break Up
2018: Surprise
2019: HBD'
2020: Social Media Goddess
2021: OMO (On My Own)
2022: Shawty

Awards and honors

Notes

References

External links 
 

Living people
1994 births
Filipino female models
21st-century Filipino women singers
Filipino women rappers
Filipino YouTubers
People from Yokosuka, Kanagawa
People from Kanagawa Prefecture
Viva Records (Philippines) artists